Henry James Prescot was Governor of the Bank of England from 1849 to 1851. He had been Deputy Governor from 1847 to 1849. He replaced James Morris as Governor and was succeeded by Thomson Hankey.

See also
Chief Cashier of the Bank of England

References

External links

Governors of the Bank of England
Year of birth missing
Year of death missing
British bankers
Deputy Governors of the Bank of England